Nyctibatrachus major is a species of frog in the family Nyctibatrachidae. Its English names are Malabar night frog, large wrinkled frog  and Boulenger's narrow-eyed frog

Geographic range
It is endemic to elevations of 110–920 m, in Malabar and Wynaad, Kerala, and Anamali Conservation Area, Tamil Nadu, India.

Habitat

Its natural habitats are tropical moist lowland forests, moist montane forest, and rivers.

Conservation status
It is threatened by habitat loss.

References

Nyctibatrachus
Frogs of India
Endemic fauna of the Western Ghats
Taxonomy articles created by Polbot
Amphibians described in 1882